The Windermere Town Hall (also known as the Old Windermere Women's Club) is a historic site in Windermere, Florida, United States. It is located at 520 Main Street. On June 3, 1994, it was added to the U.S. National Register of Historic Places.

References

External links
 Orange County listings
 Orange County markers
 Great Floridians of Windermere

City and town halls in Florida
National Register of Historic Places in Orange County, Florida
Windermere, Florida
City and town halls on the National Register of Historic Places in Florida
1922 establishments in Florida
Government buildings completed in 1922